The 2007 special election in Ohio's 5th congressional district occurred when the district became vacant following the death of incumbent Paul E. Gillmor. A special election to fill the seat was called by Ohio Governor Ted Strickland for December 11, 2007. Republican nominee and Ohio State Senator Bob Latta won election to Congress, defeating Democratic nominee Robin Weirauch.

Democratic primary

Candidates
Robin Weirauch, public administrator, 2004 and 2006 Democratic nominee
George Mays, businessman

Results

Republican primary

Candidates
Bob Latta, State Senator
Steve Buehrer, State Senator
Mark Hollenbaugh, high school teacher
Fred Pieper
Michael Smitley, business consultant

Polling

Results

General election

Polling

Results

See also
List of special elections to the United States House of Representatives

References

External links

Candidate Web Sites

Republican
Steve Buehrer for Congress web site
Mark Hollenbaugh for Congress web site
Bob Latta for Congress web site
Fred Pieper for Congress web site
Michael Smitley for Congress web site

Democratic
George Mays for Congress web site
Robin Weirauch for Congress web site

2007 05
Ohio 05
Ohio 2007 05
2007 Ohio elections
United States House of Representatives 2007 05
Ohio 05